Mesenteric vessels may refer to:

 Superior mesenteric vessels
 Superior mesenteric artery
 Superior mesenteric vein
Inferior mesenteric vessels
 Inferior mesenteric artery
 Inferior mesenteric vein